= Kalan Khedi =

- village
- Location within Madhya Pradesh Location within India
- Coordinates: 23.326553°N 77.224960°E
- Country: India
- State: Madhya Pradesh
- District: Bhopal
- Tehsil: Huzur

Population (2011)
  - Total: 905
- Time zone: UTC+5:30 (IST)
- ISO 3166 code: MP-IN
- Census code: 482468

Kalan Khedi is a village in the Bhopal district of Madhya Pradesh, India. It is located in the Huzur tehsil and the Phanda block.

== Demographics ==
According to the 2011 census of India, Kalan Khedi has 187 households. The effective literacy rate (i.e. the literacy rate of population excluding children aged 6 and below) is 64.64%.

Demographics (2011 Census)
	Total	Male	Female
Population	905	458	447
Children aged below 6 years	150	75	75
Scheduled caste	283	137	146
Scheduled tribe	125	59	66
Literates	488	295	193
Workers (all)	455	246	209
Main workers (total)	260	228	32
Main workers: Cultivators	186	177	9
Main workers: Agricultural labourers	46	41	5
Main workers: Household industry workers	0	0	0
Main workers: Other	28	10	18
Marginal workers (total)	195	18	177
Marginal workers: Cultivators	35	11	24
Marginal workers: Agricultural labourers	62	6	56
Marginal workers: Household industry workers	0	0	0
Marginal workers: Others	98	1	97
Non-workers	450	212	238
